Carlos Palavecino (born 19 February 1975) is an Argentine rower. He competed in the men's coxless pair event at the 1996 Summer Olympics.

References

External links
 

1975 births
Living people
Argentine male rowers
Olympic rowers of Argentina
Rowers at the 1996 Summer Olympics
Place of birth missing (living people)